This article lists the winners and nominees for the Black Reel Award for Outstanding Documentary. This award is given to the directors and was first awarded during the 2010 ceremony.

Winners and nominees
Winners are listed first and highlighted in bold.

2010s

2020s

Multiple nominations and wins

Multiple nominations

 3 Nominations
 Stanley Nelson
 Roger Ross Williams

 2 Nominations
 Ava DuVernay
 Liz Garbus
 Alan Hicks 
 Spike Lee
 Kevin Macdonald 
 Sam Pollard
 Dawn Porter

References

Black Reel Awards